Pinedale Shores, Alabama is a populated place in Marshall County.

References

Towns in Alabama
Marshall County, Alabama